The 1925–26 Syracuse Orangemen basketball team represented Syracuse University in intercollegiate basketball during the 1925–26 season. The team finished the season with a 19–1 record and was retroactively named the national champion by the Helms Athletic Foundation and the Premo-Porretta Power Poll. Vic Hanson was named an All-American for the second straight year.

Schedule and results

|-
!colspan=9 style="background:#FF6F00; color:#FFFFFF;"| Regular season

Source

References

External links
 OrangeHoops.com recap of 1925–26 season

Syracuse Orange men's basketball seasons
NCAA Division I men's basketball tournament championship seasons
Syracuse
Syracuse Orangemen Basketball Team
Syracuse Orangemen Basketball Team